BMD may refer to:

Organisations
Bangladesh Meteorological Department
 BMD Group, an Australian civil engineering company
 Botswana Movement for Democracy, the largest opposition party in Botswana
 Civil registration or General Register Office (from Births, Marriages and Deaths)
 FreeBMD, a website for searching births, deaths and marriages records
 Blackmagic Design, an Australian digital cinema company

Military
 Ballistic Missile Defense
 Boyevaya Mashina Desanta (Russian "Боевая Машина Десанта", literally "Combat Vehicle of the Airborne"), a series of Soviet/Russian airborne infantry fighting vehicles
 BMD-1
 BMD-2
 BMD-3
 BMD-4

Medicine
 Bacitracin methylene disalicylate, an antibiotic growth promoter
 Becker muscular dystrophy
 Berkeley Mortality Database, a precursor to the Human Mortality Database
 Bone mineral density
 Broth microdilution
 Bipolar Mood Disorder (Bipolar disorder)

Other
 Ballot marking device
 Bermudian dollar by ISO 4217 code
 Bending moment diagram, a type of shear and moment diagram used in mechanical engineering
 Bernese Mountain Dog
 Brimsdown railway station, London (National Rail station code BMD)
 Bruce Mau Design
 Binary moment diagram

See also
 BDM (disambiguation)